Daxing Subdistrict is a subdistrict in Longting District, Kaifeng, Henan, China. , it has 2 residential communities under its administration.

See also 
 List of township-level divisions of Henan

References 

Township-level divisions of Henan
Kaifeng